Alarm is a 1938 Danish family film directed by Lau Lauritzen Jr. and Alice O'Fredericks.

Cast
Lau Lauritzen Jr. as Jess Clark
Betty Söderberg as Gerda Clark
Victor Borge as Tjener Cæsar ... credited as Børge Rosenbaum, but on later DVD cover as Victor Borge
Johannes Meyer as Fabrikant Schmidt
Victor Montell as Assistant hos Smith
Karen Jønsson as Pressefotograf
Hans Egede Budtz as Direktør for Falck Redningskorps
Poul Reichhardt as Falckmand Petersen
Paul Rohde as Sagfører Skov
Sigurd Langberg as En vagabond
Thorkil Lauritzen as En falckmand

External links

1938 films
1930s Danish-language films
Danish black-and-white films
Films directed by Lau Lauritzen Jr.
Films directed by Alice O'Fredericks